In the theory of renewal processes, a part of the mathematical theory of probability, the residual time or the forward recurrence time is the time between any given time  and the next epoch of the renewal process under consideration. In the context of random walks, it is also known as overshoot. Another way to phrase residual time is "how much more time is there to wait?". 

The residual time is very important in most of the practical applications of renewal processes:
 In queueing theory, it determines the remaining time, that a newly arriving customer to a non-empty queue has to wait until being served.
 In wireless networking, it determines, for example, the remaining lifetime of a wireless link on arrival of a new packet.
 In dependability studies, it models the remaining lifetime of a component.
 etc.

Formal definition 

Probability distribution of the residual time 

Likewise, the cumulative distribution of the residual time is 

An interesting fact is that the limiting distribution of forward recurrence time (or residual time) has the same form as the limiting distribution of the backward recurrence time (or age). This distribution is always J-shaped, with mode at zero.

The first two moments of this limiting distribution  are:

Waiting time paradox 
The fact that  (for ) is also known variously as the waiting time paradox, inspection paradox, or the paradox of renewal theory. The paradox arises from the fact that the average waiting time until the next renewal, assuming that the reference time point  is uniform randomly selected within the inter-renewal interval, is larger than the average inter-renewal interval . The average waiting is  only when , that is when the renewals are always punctual or deterministic.

Special case: Markovian holding times 
That is because  and:

This is a known characteristic of the exponential distribution, i.e., its memoryless property. Intuitively, this means that it does not matter how long it has been since the last renewal epoch, the remaining time is still probabilistically the same as in the beginning of the holding time interval.

Related notions 
Its distribution can be calculated in a similar way to that of the residual time. Likewise, the total life time is the sum of backward recurrence time and forward recurrence time.

References

Time
Point processes